Sevenless (sev) is a gene in Drosophila melanogaster that encodes a receptor tyrosine kinase protein essential to the development of R7 cells in the Drosophila embryonic eye. The drosophila ommatidium contains 8 distinct retinula or R cells, each of which has a different spectral sensitivity. The R7 photo receptor, located in each of several ommatidium in the fly's compound eye, is used to detect ultraviolet light. The R8 photo receptor contains an activator of the RTK (receptor tyrosine kinase) for on a precursor R7 cell, called the bride of sevenless (BOSS). The binding of BOSS to sevenless stimulates a complex series of reactions involving the RTK (sevenless), MAP kinases, Ras and many more molecules to differentiate that precursor R7 photo receptor to a fully functional R7 photo receptor that can see UV light. Much of this knowledge was gained by examining flies with a mutant sevenless which still produced a fully functional R7 photoreceptor when a dominant Ras was injected into the mutant R7 precursor.

References 

Drosophila melanogaster genes